Dunkeld is a suburb of Johannesburg, South Africa. It is located in Region 3. It is bordered by the suburbs of Hyde Park and Illovo to the north, Melrose to the east, Rosebank in the south and to the west, Dunkeld West.

Origin of the name
The Dunkeld suburbs name has it origin in a small town in Perth and Kinross, Scotland. The township was laid out in 1904. The main street through the suburb, Bompass Street, is named after accountant and real estate pioneer Frank W.R. Bompass.

References

External links 
 Scottish Place Names in Johannesburg, South Africa lists suburbs with Scottish placenames.

Johannesburg Region B